Joseph C. Palumbo (August 1, 1929 – December 5, 2013) was an American football guard.  He played college football for the University of Virginia Cavaliers. He was later elected into the Virginia Sports Hall of Fame in 1976, and the College Football Hall of Fame in 1999.

References

1929 births
2013 deaths
People from Beaver, Pennsylvania
Players of American football from Pennsylvania
American football offensive guards
Virginia Cavaliers football players
College Football Hall of Fame inductees
Greenbrier Military School alumni